Events from the year 1822 in Germany

Incumbents

Kingdoms 
 Kingdom of Prussia
 Monarch – Frederick William III of Prussia (16 November 1797 – 7 June 1840)
 Kingdom of Bavaria
 Maximilian I (1 January 1806 – 13 October 1825)
 Kingdom of Saxony
 Frederick Augustus I (20 December 1806 – 5 May 1827)
 Kingdom of Hanover
 George IV  (29 January 1820 – 26 June 1830)
 Kingdom of Württemberg
 William (30 October 1816 – 25 June 1864)

Grand Duchies 
 Grand Duke of Baden
 Louis I (8 December 1818 – 30 March 1830)
 Grand Duke of Hesse
 Louis I (14 August 1806 – 6 April 1830)
 Grand Duke of Mecklenburg-Schwerin
 Frederick Francis I– (24 April 1785 – 1 February 1837)
 Grand Duke of Mecklenburg-Strelitz
 George (6 November 1816 – 6 September 1860)
 Grand Duke of Oldenburg
 Wilhelm (6 July 1785 –2 July 1823 ) Due to mental illness, Wilhelm was duke in name only, with his cousin Peter, Prince-Bishop of Lübeck, acting as regent throughout his entire reign.
 Peter I (2 July 1823 - 21 May 1829)
 Grand Duke of Saxe-Weimar-Eisenach
 Charles Frederick (14 June 1828 - 8 July 1853)

Principalities 
 Schaumburg-Lippe
 George William (13 February 1787 - 1860)
 Schwarzburg-Rudolstadt
 Friedrich Günther (28 April 1807 - 28 June 1867)
 Schwarzburg-Sondershausen
 Günther Friedrich Karl I (14 October 1794 - 19 August 1835)
 Principality of Lippe
 Leopold II (5 November 1802 - 1 January 1851)
 Principality of Reuss-Greiz
 Heinrich XIX (29 January 1817 - 31 October 1836)
 Waldeck and Pyrmont
 George II (9 September 1813 - 15 May 1845)

Duchies 
 Duke of Anhalt-Dessau
 Leopold IV (9 August 1817 - 22 May 1871)
 Duke of Brunswick
 Charles II (16 June 1815 – 9 September 1830)
 Duke of Saxe-Altenburg
 Duke of Saxe-Hildburghausen (1780–1826)  - Frederick
 Duke of Saxe-Coburg and Gotha
 Ernest I (9 December 1806 – 12 November 1826)
 Duke of Saxe-Meiningen
 Bernhard II (24 December 1803 – 20 September 1866)
 Duke of Schleswig-Holstein-Sonderburg-Beck
 Frederick William (25 March 1816 – 6 July 1825)

Events 
 "Rostocker Pfeilstorch", a white stork, is found in northern Germany with an arrow from central Africa through its neck, demonstrating the fact of bird migration.
 The Rhine Province, the westernmost province of the Kingdom of Prussia and the Free State of Prussia, within the German Reich, established from 1822 to 1946.
 Röchling SE & Co. KG, a plastics engineering company headquartered in Mannheim, Baden-Württemberg, Germany is established.
 Franckh-Kosmos Verlags-GmbH & Co., a media publishing house based in Stuttgart, Germany, founded.

Births 
 2 January – Rudolf Clausius, German physicist (d. 1888)
 6 January-Heinrich Schliemann, German archaeologist (d. 1890)
 18 April – August Heinrich Petermann, German cartographer (died 1878)
 27 August – Theodor Martens, German painter (died 1884)

Deaths 
 14 January – Franz Kobell, German painter, etcher and draftsman (born 1749)
 22 January – Rudolph Schadow, German sculptor (born 1786)  16 January – Elisabeth Berenberg, German banker (b. 1749)
 23 February – Johann Matthäus Bechstein, German naturalist (born 1757)
 3 April – Friedrich Justin Bertuch, German patron of the arts (born 1747)
 27 May – Augustus, Duke of Saxe-Gotha-Altenburg (b. 1772)
 25 June – E. T. A. Hoffmann, German Romantic writer (born 1776)
 25 August – William Herschel, German-born British astronomer (b. 1738)
 26 November – Karl August von Hardenberg, Prussian politician (b. 1750)
 8 December – Saul Ascher, German political writer and translator (born 1767)
 28 December – Albert Christoph Dies, German painter and composer (born 1755)

References

Years of the 19th century in Germany
1822 in Germany
1822 in Europe